Pycnocoma is a genus of plant of the family Euphorbiaceae first described as a genus in 1849. It is native to tropical Africa and Madagascar.

Species

Formerly included
moved to other genera: Argomuellera Droceloncia

References

Pycnocomeae
Euphorbiaceae genera
Flora of Africa